Justice Goldberg may refer to:

Arthur Goldberg (1908–1990), associate justice of the Supreme Court of the United States
Eliezer Goldberg (1931–2022), judge of the Supreme Court of Israel
Maureen McKenna Goldberg (fl. 1960s–2020s), justice of the Rhode Island Supreme Court